William Box may refer to:

 Bill Box (1938–2006), Australian rules footballer for Essendon
 William Draper Box (1841–1904), Australian politician, member of the Queensland Legislative Council
 William Box (American politician), member of the South Dakota House of Representatives